Bevan Fransch (born 16 May 1986 in Cape Town, Western Cape) is a South African football (soccer) player who plays as a defender for Vasco da Gama in the National First Division.
 
He hails from Bonteheuwel on the Cape Flats.

References

1986 births
South African soccer players
Living people
Association football defenders
Santos F.C. (South Africa) players
Sportspeople from Cape Town
Cape Coloureds
Maritzburg United F.C. players
Bloemfontein Celtic F.C. players
Vasco da Gama (South Africa) players